Antônio Fábio Francês Cavalcante (born 27 November 1983), commonly known as Fabinho Capixaba, is a Brazilian footballer who plays as a right back.

Club career
Born in Vitória, Espírito Santo, Fabinho Capixaba graduated from Desportiva's youth setup, but made his senior debuts for América Mineiro. After a loan stint at Club América, he went on to appear at several countryside clubs of São Paulo and Rio de Janeiro (with a short stint at Polish Ekstraklasa side Pogoń Szczecin).

On 5 May 2008 Fabinho Capixaba joined Série A side Palmeiras. He appeared regularly for the club during the year, but eventually lost his space in 2009.

On 5 August 2009 Fabinho Capixaba was loaned to Avaí until December. He subsequently served another temporary deals at Coritiba, Mirassol, Criciúma and Joinville before being released by Verdão in 2013.

On 12 December 2013 Fabinho Capixaba signed for Atlético Sorocaba, newly promoted to Campeonato Paulista Série A1. He appeared regularly for the side, which was immediately relegated back.

On 28 January 2015 Fabinho Capixaba was presented at Portuguesa.

Honours 
 Sertãozinho
 Campeonato Paulista Série A3: 2004

 Coritiba
 Campeonato Paranaense: 2010
 Campeonato Brasileiro Série B: 2010

References

External links
 
 Fabinho Capixaba at playmakerstats.com (English version of ogol.com.br)
 

1983 births
Living people
People from Vitória, Espírito Santo
Brazilian footballers
Association football defenders
Campeonato Brasileiro Série A players
Campeonato Brasileiro Série B players
Ekstraklasa players
Brazilian expatriate footballers
Brazilian expatriate sportspeople in Mexico
Expatriate footballers in Mexico
Brazilian expatriate sportspeople in Poland
Expatriate footballers in Poland
América Futebol Clube (MG) players
Club América footballers
Grêmio Esportivo Sãocarlense players
São Cristóvão de Futebol e Regatas players
Sertãozinho Futebol Clube players
Marília Atlético Clube players
União Agrícola Barbarense Futebol Clube players
Pogoń Szczecin players
Americano Futebol Clube players
Volta Redonda FC players
Mirassol Futebol Clube players
Sociedade Esportiva Palmeiras players
Avaí FC players
Coritiba Foot Ball Club players
Criciúma Esporte Clube players
Joinville Esporte Clube players
Clube Atlético Sorocaba players
Associação Portuguesa de Desportos players
CE Operário Várzea-Grandense players
Sportspeople from Espírito Santo